Japan will compete at the 2009 World Championships in Athletics from 15–23 August. A team of 57 athletes was announced in preparation for the competition. Selected athletes have achieved one of the competition's qualifying standards. Koji Murofushi (hammer throw), Yuki Yamazaki (50 km walk), and the athletes from the Marathon team are considered the country's best medal chances.

Team selection

Track and road events

Field and combined events

Results

Men
Track and road events

Field and combined events

Women
Track and road events

Field events

References

External links
Official competition website

Nations at the 2009 World Championships in Athletics
World Championships in Athletics
Japan at the World Championships in Athletics